Barbecue sauce (also abbreviated as BBQ sauce) is a sauce used as a marinade, basting, condiment, or topping for meat cooked in the barbecue cooking style, including pork or beef ribs and chicken. It is a ubiquitous condiment in the Southern United States and is used on many other foods as well.

Ingredients vary, but most include vinegar or tomato paste (or a combination) as a base, as well as liquid smoke, onion powder, spices such as mustard and black pepper, and sweeteners such as sugar or molasses.

History

Some place the origin of barbecue sauce at the formation of the first American colonies in the 17th century. References to the sauce start occurring in both English and French literature over the next two hundred years. South Carolina mustard sauce, a type of barbecue sauce, can be traced to German settlers in the 18th century.

Early homemade barbecue sauces were made with vinegar, salt, and pepper. Sugar, ketchup, and Worcestershire sauce started to be used in the 1920s, but after World War II, the quantity of sugar and the number of ingredients increased dramatically.

The Georgia Barbecue Sauce Company of Atlanta advertised an early commercially produced barbecue sauce in 1909. Heinz was the first major company to sell bottled barbecue sauce in 1940. Soon afterward, General Foods introduced "Open Pit." Kraft Foods only entered the market in around 1960, but with heavy advertising, succeeded in becoming the market leader. Kraft also started making cooking oils with bags of spice attached, supplying another market entrance of barbecue sauce.

Variations
Different geographical regions have allegiances to their particular styles and variations of barbecue sauce.

 East Carolina – Most American barbecue sauces can trace their roots to a sauce common in the eastern regions of North Carolina and South Carolina. The simplest and the earliest, it was popularized by enslaved Africans who also advanced the development of American barbecue, and originally was made with vinegar, ground black pepper, and hot chili pepper flakes. It is used as a "mopping" sauce to baste the meat while it is cooking and as a dipping sauce when it is served. "Thin, spicy, and vinegar based," it penetrates the meat and cuts the fats in the mouth, with a noticeably tarter flavor than most other barbecue sauces.
 Western Carolina – In Lexington and the Piedmont areas of western North Carolina, the sauce is often called a dip. It is similar to the East Carolina Sauce with the addition of tomato paste, tomato sauce, or ketchup.

South Carolina mustard sauce – Part of South Carolina is known for its yellow barbecue sauces made primarily of yellow mustard, vinegar, sugar and spices. This sauce is most common in a belt from Columbia to Charleston.
 Memphis – Similar to the Western Carolina style, but using molasses as a sweetener and with additional spices. It is usually served as a dipping sauce, as Memphis-style barbecue is typically a dry rub.
 Kansas City – Thick, reddish-brown, tomato-based, and made with sugar, vinegar, and spices. It evolved from the Western Carolina and Memphis style sauces but is thicker and sweeter and does not penetrate the meat as much as it sits on the surface. Typical commercial barbecue sauce is based on the Kansas City style.
Texas – In some of the older, more traditional restaurants, the sauces are heavily seasoned with cumin, chili peppers or chili powder, black pepper, and fresh onion,   while using less tomato and sugar. They are medium thick and often resemble a thin tomato soup. They penetrate the meat easily rather than sit on top. Bottled barbecue sauces from Texas are often different from those used in the same restaurants because they do not contain meat drippings.
 Alabama white sauce – North Alabama is known for its distinctive white sauce, a mayonnaise-based sauce that also includes apple cider vinegar, sugar, salt, and black pepper, which is used predominantly on chicken and pork.

See also

 Barbacoa
 Brown sauce
 Ketchup
 List of barbecue dishes
 
 List of sauces
 Marination
 Regional variations of barbecue
 Steak sauce

References

 
Marinades